Ate ng Ate Ko is a Philippine television drama series broadcast by TV5. Directed by Linnet Zurbano, it stars Kris Bernal and Isabelle de Leon. The series premiered on November 23, 2020 on the network's Primetime Todo evening block, and aired every Mondays until its final episode on February 15, 2021.

Plot
After they become orphan in a young age, Riki (Kris Bernal) raised her younger sibling Yumi (Isabelle de Leon). However due to an incident, their world turned upside down. Will Yumi be able to be a responsible sister to her sister?

Cast and characters

Lead cast
 Kris Bernal as Atty. Marikit "Riki" Gonzalez
 Isabelle de Leon as Mayumi "Yumi" Gonzalez
 Jake Cuenca as Marco Toledo
 Joem Bascon as Dr. Frank Sevilla

Supporting cast
 Tonton Gutierrez as Alberto Toledo
 Kim Last as Patrick Sevilla
 Phil Noble as Tope
 Jervy "Patani" Daño as Char
 Pinky Aseron as Judge Emily
 Jordan Hong as Heindrich

Guest cast
 Yayo Aguila as Mithi Gonzalez
 Rey Abellana as Ludovic Gonzalez

About Bernal

References

TV5 (Philippine TV network) drama series
Philippine drama television series
2020 Philippine television series debuts
2021 Philippine television series endings
Philippine romance television series
Television series by Cignal Entertainment
Filipino-language television shows